Mindelstetten is a municipality in the district of Eichstätt in Bavaria in Germany.

It is a center of veneration for Saint Anna Schäffer.

Mayors
since 2014: Alfred Paulus (CWG)
2002-2014: Josef Kunder (CSU)

Notable people 

 Anna Schäffer (1882-1925), canonized by Pope Benedict XVI on October 21, 2012

References

Eichstätt (district)